Antoni Potocki may refer to:

 Antoni Potocki (1780–1850), Polish nobleman
 Antoni Protazy Potocki (1761–1801), Polish noble
 Antoni Michał Potocki (died 1766), Polish noble